Immonen is a Finnish surname, most prevalent in Kainuu. Notable people with the surname include:

Riitta Immonen (1918–2008), Finnish fashion artist and entrepreneur
Antero Immonen (born 1935), Finnish ski jumper
Waltteri Immonen (born 1967), Finnish ice hockey defenseman and coach
Janne Immonen (born 1968), Finnish cross country skier
Mika Immonen (born 1972), Finnish pool player
Riku Immonen (born 1974), Finnish Muay Thai kickboxer and coach
Jukka Immonen (born 1978), Finnish musician, record producer and composer
Jarkko Immonen (born 1982), Finnish ice hockey player
Jarkko Immonen (ice hockey, born 1984), Finnish ice hockey player
Lotta Immonen (born 1996), Finnish curler
Olli Immonen (born 1986), member of the Finnish Parliament
Kaarina Immonen, Finnish United Nations official
Kathryn Immonen, Canadian comic book and webcomic writer
Stuart Immonen, Canadian comic book artist

Finnish-language surnames
Surnames of Finnish origin